You Light Up My Life may refer to:
"You Light Up My Life", a song by Carole King from her 1973 album Fantasy
 You Light Up My Life (film), a 1977 romantic drama
 You Light Up My Life (soundtrack), soundtrack album to the 1977 film
 "You Light Up My Life" (song), title song from the 1977 film, later covered by various artists
You Light Up My Life (Debby Boone album), 1977
You Light Up My Life (Johnny Mathis album), 1978
You Light Up My Life: Inspirational Songs, a 1997 album by LeAnn Rimes

See also
"Light Up My Life", a 2018 song by Mai Kuraki
"Someone to Light Up My Life", a 1956 song by Antonio Carlos Jobim